Monopylocystis visvesvarai is a species of excavates, placed in the monotypic genus Monopylocystis, and belonging to the group Heterolobosea.

References

Percolozoa
Excavata genera
Monotypic eukaryote genera